The Canadian Cartographic Association (CCA;  - ACC), is a learned society devoted to cartography in Canada.
It is affiliated with the International Cartographic Association.  
CCA publishes the journal Cartographica.

See also
Canadian Remote Sensing Society

References

Further reading
 

Cartography organizations
Learned societies of Canada